"Jokester" is a 1956 science fiction short story by Isaac Asimov.

Jokester may also refer to:

People
Roles
 Jester, a court fool
 Comedian, a comic, person who tells jokes
 Practical joker, one who plays practical jokes
 Funnyman or joker, a person who frequently tells jokes

Persons
 Marlon Jackson (born 1957) nicknamed "Jokester", member of the Jackson 5

Fictional characters
 The Jokester, an alternate universe version of the DC Comics character The Joker, see Alternative versions of Joker
 The Jokester, a fictional character from the 2006 MTV TV show The Gamekillers

Other uses
 Jokester (1995 song) a song by Leftover Salmon off their album Ask the Fish

See also
 Practical joker (disambiguation)
 Joker (disambiguation)
 Jester (disambiguation)
 Comedian (disambiguation)
 Comic (disambiguation)
 Funny Man (disambiguation)